Summer Bones is the fourth full-length studio album from the American pop punk band Hit the Lights, released on March 24, 2015. It was produced and mixed by Kyle Black (New Found Glory/All Time Low/State Champs). This is the band's first release on Pure Noise Records, as well as their shortest full-length album to date. The album's final track features guest vocals from original vocalist Colin Ross.

Release history
In January 2015, Hit the Lights announced the title and release date for the album. A few days later, they premiered the first track off the album, "Fucked Up Kids," along with the track listing. Leading up to its release, the band premiered more songs including "The Real" and "No Filter" to build anticipation. The band announced on Twitter that they "wrote Invicta because we wanted to push ourselves. We wrote Summer Bones because we wanted to rip shit. We stand by both." Summer Bones premiered on the Glamour Kills website on March 18, 2015.

The music video for "Life on the Bottom" premiered on ESPN.com on April 9, 2015. In July and August, the group supported State Champs on the Shot Boys of Summer Tour with Tiny Moving Parts, Let It Happen, and Northbound. On March 9, 2016, a music video for "No Filter" was released on YouTube. The single has since been streamed over 3 million times. In October 2016, the group supported Simple Plan on their tour of Canada. In October and November, the group supported Good Charlotte on their headlining US tour.

Acoustic versions of "Blasphemy, Myself and I," "Fucked Up Kids," and "Summer Bones" were released on the band's 2016 EP Just to Get Through to You.

Reception
The album was included at number 30 on Rock Sounds top 50 releases of 2015 list.

Track listing
"Fucked Up Kids" - 2:31
"The Real" - 2:37
"Life on the Bottom" - 2:27
"Revolutions and Executions" - 3:05
"No Filter" - 2:54
"Blasphemy, Myself and I" - 2:40
"Summer Bones" - 3:45
"Keep Your Head - 1:29
"Sitter" - 2:25
"Old Friend" - 2:33

Personnel
Nick Thompson - vocals, guitar, bass
Omar Zehery - guitar, bass, vocals, additional engineering, production, programming
Kevin Mahoney - guitar, bass, vocals
Nathan Vandame - drums
Colin Ross - guest vocals on "Old Friend"
Kevin Ashba - organ and piano on "Summer Bones"
Jay Wayman -producer, mixer, engineer
Devin Corey - engineer
Colin Shwankee - additional production
Jacob Bautista - additional engineering
Josh Barber - additional production on "The Real"
Brad Blackwood - mastering
Mark Metzger - artwork, layout

Chart positions

References
Citations

Sources

External links

Summer Bones at YouTube (streamed copy where licensed)

2015 albums
Hit the Lights albums
Pure Noise Records albums